Fontenay-Trésigny is a commune in the Seine-et-Marne department in the Île-de-France region in north-central France.

Location
Fontenay-Trésigny is located 43 km southeast of Paris, 24 km northeast of Melun, 28 km south of Meaux and 36 km northwest of Provins.

Fontenay-Trésigny lies in the heart of the Brie, in a strategic position in the center of the department of Seine-et-Marne.

Demographics
Fontenay-Trésigny had 5,574 inhabitants in 2017.

Inhabitants of Fontenay-Trésigny are called Trésifontains in French.

See also
 Château du duc d'Épernon, Fontenay
 Communes of the Seine-et-Marne department

References

External links

 Official website of Fontenay-Trésigny 
 French Ministry of Culture list for Fontenay-Trésigny 
 Map of Fontenay-Trésigny on Google Maps 

Communes of Seine-et-Marne